Nora Prentiss is a 1947 American film noir drama film directed by Vincent Sherman and starring Ann Sheridan, Kent Smith, Bruce Bennett, and Robert Alda. It was produced and distributed by Warner Bros. The cinematography is by James Wong Howe and the music was composed by Franz Waxman. The film's sets were designed by the art director Anton Grot.

Plot
Dr. Richard Talbot, unhappy with the dull routine of his married life in San Francisco, meets nightclub singer Nora Prentiss by chance after he sees her get struck by a truck near his office. The two gradually begin to have an affair, causing disruption in Richard's home and professional lives. He tries to cool things down with Nora after he forgets his daughter's birthday, but, when Nora says she wants to break things off entirely and he is so shaken that he almost kills a patient during surgery, he realizes he is not willing to lose her. Not knowing  how to ask his wife for a divorce, he seizes an opportunity to fake his death when a patient who looks somewhat like him and who he knows does not have any family or friends dies in his office. He puts his wedding ring on the corpse, puts the body in his car, and sets the car on fire and pushes it off a cliff before moving with Nora to New York with a large sum of money he has withdrawn from the bank. Shortly after arriving, Richard learns that the circumstances surrounding his death are under investigation.

Richard does not tell Nora what he has done until it becomes clear that she is not buying his fake explanations for why he is living under an alias and never wants to leave their hotel. Even though the truth means they will not be able to get married and that Richard will not be able to practice medicine any more, Nora says she will stick by him and starts singing at the new club her boss from San Francisco has opened in New York. Left alone while she rehearses, Richard begins to drink heavily and becomes increasingly jealous. While fleeing the scene after a fight with Nora's boss, he crashes his car and his face is badly cut and burned. The police, not realizing who the injured man is, arrest Richard as a suspect in the murder of Dr. Talbot when his fingerprints are found to be a match with some found at the crime scene.

Back in San Francisco, Richard refuses to reveal his identity or speak in his defense, since he feels that doing so will only serve to cause his family more suffering because he has already ruined any chance he may have had at a tolerable future. He convinces Nora to help him keep his secret and allow him to be convicted and executed for his own murder.

Cast
 Ann Sheridan as Nora Prentiss
 Kent Smith as Dr. Richard Talbot
 Bruce Bennett as Dr. Joel Merriam, Richard's business partner
 Robert Alda as Phil Dinardo, a nightclub owner
 Rosemary DeCamp as Lucy Talbot, Richard's wife
 John Ridgely as Walter Bailey, a patient who dies in Richard's office
 Robert Arthur as Gregory Talbot, Richard's son
 Wanda Hendrix as Bonita 'Bunny' Talbot, Richard's daughter
 Helen Brown as Miss Judson, Richard and Joel's nurse
 Rory Mallinson as Fleming, Richard's lawyer
 Henry Shannon as Police Lieutenant
 James Flavin as District Attorney
 Douglas Kennedy as Doctor
 Don McGuire as Truck Driver
 Clifton Young as Policeman

Reception

Box office
According to Warner Bros records, the film earned $2,229,000 domestically and $1,095,000 internationally.

Critical response
When the film was released, the staff at Variety magazine gave the film an unfavorable review:

Noir analysis
Critics call the movie one of the best "woman's noir."  Film historian Bob Porfirio notes, "Unlike such other Ann Sheridan or Joan Crawford motion pictures as The Unfaithful, Flamingo Road, and The Damned Don't Cry!, Nora Prentiss does not lapse into a romantic melodrama that might detract from the maudit sensibility, the quintessential element of film noir."

References

External links
 
 
 
 
 

1947 films
1947 drama films
Adultery in films
American drama films
American black-and-white films
Film noir
Films scored by Franz Waxman
Films about capital punishment
Films directed by Vincent Sherman
Films set in New York City
Films set in San Francisco
Films with screenplays by N. Richard Nash
Warner Bros. films
1940s English-language films
1940s American films